Alar Laneman (born 6 May 1962) is an Estonian politician. He served as Minister of the Interior in the second cabinet of Prime Minister Jüri Ratas from 18 November 2020 to 26 January 2021. Kristian Jaani was appointed as his successor. He is affiliated with the Conservative People's Party of Estonia (EKRE).

References 

1962 births
21st-century Estonian politicians
Conservative People's Party of Estonia politicians
Government ministers of Estonia
Living people
Members of the Riigikogu, 2019–2023
Members of the Riigikogu, 2023–2027
Ministers of the Interior of Estonia
People from Vändra